The 1914–15 season was Chelsea Football Club's tenth competitive season. It was also the final full season before competitive football was suspended until the end of World War I. The season was one of mixed fortunes for the club: they finished 19th in the First Division, but also reached the FA Cup final for the first time, where they lost to Sheffield United.

Having finished 19th, Chelsea would ordinarily have been relegated, but the First Division expanded to 22 teams when competitive football resumed in 1919, and the club were re-elected into the division. A factor in the decision was the exposure of a match-fixing scandal involving Manchester United and Liverpool players, who had colluded to ensure a 2–0 win for a United in an April 1915 fixture, a result which meant United avoided relegation at Chelsea's expense.

Table

Notes

References

External links
 1914–15 season at stamford-bridge.com

1914–15
English football clubs 1914–15 season